The 1975 football season was São Paulo's 46th season since club's existence.

Statistics

Scorers

Overall 
{|class="wikitable"
|-
|Games played || 72 (35 Campeonato Paulista, 28 Campeonato Brasileiro, 9 Friendly match)
|-
|Games won || 42 (26 Campeonato Paulista, 11 Campeonato Brasileiro, 5 Friendly match)
|-
|Games drawn || 24 (7 Campeonato Paulista, 14 Campeonato Brasileiro, 3 Friendly match)
|-
|Games lost || 5 (2 Campeonato Paulista, 3 Campeonato Brasileiro, 1 Friendly match)
|-
|Goals scored || 104
|-
|Goals conceded || 40
|-
|Goal difference || +64
|-
|Best result || 5–0 (H) v Noroeste - Campeonato Paulista - 1975.07.10
|-
|Worst result || 1–2 (A) v Santos - Campeonato Paulista - 1975.08.071–2 (H) v Portuguesa - Campeonato Brasileiro - 1975.11.231–2 (H) v Grêmio - Campeonato Brasileiro - 1975.11.29
|-
|Most appearances || Waldir Peres (67)
|-
|Top scorer || Serginho (35)
|-

Friendlies

Torneio Laudo Natel

I Copa Internacional de São Paulo

Official competitions

Campeonato Paulista

Record

Campeonato Brasileiro

Record

External links
official website

References

Association football clubs 1975 season
1975
1975 in Brazilian football